The Director-General of the Australian Secret Intelligence Service is the executive officer of the Australian Secret Intelligence Service (ASIS), Australia's foreign intelligence agency.

The Director-General of ASIS is directly responsible to the Minister for Foreign Affairs, and regularly meets with the Minister to brief them on ASIS activities. The current director is Paul Symon AO.

List of directors-general
There have been eleven officially-appointed Directors and Directors-General of ASIS since 1952.

References

 
Australian Secret Intelligence Service